John Abdy Lyons Fosbery (2 October 1909 – 9 January 2005) was a British philatelist who was added to the Roll of Distinguished Philatelists in 1986.

Fosbery was a specialist in the philately of South America and founded the Spanish Main Philatelic Society.

Fosbery served in the British Army during the Second World War rising to the rank of Major.

References

Further reading
Akerman, Clive. (2005) John Abdy Lyons Fosbery, RDP, FRPSL. Lydbrook: Clive Akerman.

Signatories to the Roll of Distinguished Philatelists
British philatelists
1909 births
2005 deaths
Fellows of the Royal Philatelic Society London
Royal Artillery officers
British stamp dealers